Zvenigovsky District (Provoj kundem) is an administrative and municipal district (raion), one of the fourteen in the Mari El Republic, Russia. It is located in the south of the republic. Its administrative center is the town of Zvenigovo. As of the 2010 Census, the total population of the district was 44,976, with the population of Zvenigovo accounting for 26.6% of that number.

Administrative and municipal status
Within the framework of administrative divisions, Zvenigovsky District is one of the fourteen in the republic. It is divided into one town of district significance (Zvenigovo), two urban-type settlements (administrative divisions with the administrative centers in the urban-type settlements (inhabited localities) of Krasnogorsky and Suslonger), and seven rural okrugs, all of which comprise eighty rural localities. As a municipal division, the district is incorporated as Zvenigovsky Municipal District. The town of district significance and the two urban-type settlements are incorporated into three urban settlements, and the seven rural okrugs are incorporated into seven rural settlements within the municipal district. The town of Zvenigovo serves as the administrative center of both the administrative and municipal district.

References

Notes

Sources

Districts of Mari El
